Platytroctes is a genus of ray-finned fish in the family Platytroctidae, the tubeshoulders.

Species
There are currently two recognized species in this genus:
 Platytroctes apus Günther, 1878 – legless searsid
 Platytroctes mirus (Lloyd, 1909) – leaf searsid

References

Platytroctidae
Ray-finned fish genera
Taxa named by Albert Günther